Piers Richard Corbyn (born 10 March 1947) is a British weather forecaster, businessman, climate change denier, anti-vaccine activist, and conspiracy theorist.

Born in Wiltshire, Corbyn was raised in Shropshire where he attended Adams' Grammar School. He was awarded a first class BSc degree in physics from Imperial College London in 1968 and a postgraduate MSc in astrophysics from Queen Mary College, University of London, in 1981. Corbyn was a member of the Labour Party and served as a councillor in the London Borough of Southwark from 1986 to 1990. He is the elder brother of former Labour Party leader Jeremy Corbyn. He left Labour due to his opposition to the Iraq War.

Corbyn ran a weather monitoring company called WeatherAction in the 1990s and gained some prominence in the media for his predictions and, later more so, for his rejection of the scientific consensus on climate change.

Throughout the COVID-19 pandemic, he has been a prominent proponent of conspiracy theories. He has described SARS-CoV-2 as a "hoax", frequently campaigned against lockdowns and against COVID-19 vaccines, and has described COVID-19 vaccines as dangerous. Corbyn has been arrested on several occasions for partaking of protests against public health laws, and for calling on supporters to commit violent acts against members of Parliament.

Early life and education
Piers Corbyn was born on 10 March 1947 in Chippenham, Wiltshire. He grew up at Yew Tree Manor in Pave Lane, in Newport, Shropshire, a 17th-century country house which was once part of the Duke of Sutherland's Lilleshall estate.

He began recording weather and climate patterns in 1962 at the age of fifteen, constructing his own observation equipment. He attended Castle House School and Adams' Grammar School in Newport, Shropshire. At 18, he went to Imperial College London, being awarded a first class BSc degree in physics in 1968. He commenced postgraduate research there into superconductivity, but then went into student representation and politics for some years. In 1979, he returned to postgraduate study at Queen Mary College, University of London, being awarded an MSc in astrophysics in 1981. While he was an undergraduate, an article by Corbyn was published in the Royal Meteorological Society's magazine Weather discussing a brine barometer and an electrical thermometer.

Student representation
In 1969, Corbyn became the first president of the Imperial College Students' Union to be directly elected by the student body. As president until 1970, Corbyn was successful in establishing a sabbatical union president, enabling the elected student leader to be registered at the college without having to study or pay fees (in fact they received a grant from the college and union).

Corbyn set up a short-lived Imperial College Representative Council, seats on which were distributed between members of the college on the basis of their numbers, a system that almost gave students a majority. The ICAUT, a staff union, refused to cooperate with this student-led initiative. Although this particular council did not survive, increased student representation on college boards and committees became, like the sabbatical president, a lasting success of Corbyn's time as ICU president.

Corbyn, together with the rector at the time, Lord Penney, received the Queen when she opened a new administrative building in 1969. During the visit Corbyn petitioned the Queen in front of 900 people, asking for students to be given greater say in the governance of the college.

Housing rights
Corbyn was a housing and squatters' rights activist in the north Paddington area of Westminster in the mid-1970s. In 1974, he fought for a seat on the council as a Squatters and Tenants candidate; in 1978, he and a colleague fought as Decent Housing candidates. In the 1977 GLC election he was the International Marxist Group candidate for Lambeth Central. He and some of the squatters in Elgin Avenue were, as a result of their campaign which included the building of barricades against eviction, rehoused by the GLC in 1975 spread out between Westminster and other London boroughs to discourage the risk of further united action. He later moved from that rehousing in Rust Square to the Alvey Estate in Southwark where he became a leader of the tenants association.

Career

Party politics
Corbyn was a member of the Labour Party and served as a councillor for Burgess Ward, in the London Borough of Southwark, between 1986 and 1990. In 1987, Corbyn was arrested for the defacing of an SDP–Liberal Alliance poster, but cautioned and released without charge.  For seven years he was an unpaid campaigns organiser in Bermondsey and Southwark, being thanked by Tony Blair in 1998 at Downing Street. Corbyn left the Labour Party in 2002 in the run up to the invasion of Iraq, and stood as an independent candidate in the Southwark London Borough Council elections in 2015 and 2022. According to The Sunday Times in September 2017, his attempt to rejoin the Southwark Constituency Labour Party in January 2017 was blocked.

His brother, Jeremy Corbyn, has been the MP for Islington North since 1983 and served as Leader of the Opposition and Leader of the Labour Party from 2015 to 2020. In August 2015, Corbyn supported his brother's campaign in the Labour Party leadership election, on the basis that he stood for proper debate and accountability, including on climate. On Twitter, he urged people to register to vote and back Jeremy Corbyn to lead the Labour Party.

In 2016, Corbyn was among a group of protesters at a Lambeth council meeting who "screamed abuse in the faces" of party councillors.

WeatherAction
Following some years of weather prediction as an occupation, he formed WeatherAction, a business, in 1995. WeatherAction is the business through which Corbyn sells his predictions. He has in the past bet on these predictions. His betting attracted much interest in 1990, when his predictions of severe weather were met by a year of the "worst extremes".

WeatherAction was formerly listed on the Alternative Investment Market (AIM) as 'Weather Action Holdings plc' in 1997, and was transferred back to private ownership in 1999, primarily because of sustaining increasing losses and the impact of costs related to listed status (around £70,000 annually) compared to annual revenues of £250,000. Corbyn reacquired the weather prediction business; the listed shell was taken over by investors and changed its name to 'InternetAction.com', with the intent of researching potential net-based takeover targets.

WeatherAction left the Alternative Investment Market in 1999 after reported losses incurred during its time as a public company of £480,000 and its share price dropped from 79p a share to 24p.

Prediction methods
Corbyn's technique "combines statistical analysis of over a century of historical weather patterns with clues derived from solar observations." He considers past weather patterns and solar observations and sun-earth magnetic connectivity. However, meteorological studies show that such influences cause minimal impact on the Earth's atmosphere.

Scientific review
The only study involving Corbyn's work published in a peer-reviewed journal was in the Journal of Atmospheric and Solar-Terrestrial Physics (2001). Its investigation was limited to Corbyn's "likely damaging gale periods" predictions for the island of Great Britain for October 1995 to September 1997. Corbyn's enlisted work (carried out for a consortium of insurance companies) was only for the most likely periods of the strongest winds and specifically not a full forecast to include lesser winds:

In a 1999 edition of Wired magazine, researchers Ian Jolliffe and Nils Jolliffe stated of Corbyn's predictions that: "It is unusual for most of the detail to be completely correct, but equally it is rare for nearly everything to be wrong… Some forecasts are clearly very good, and a few are very poor, but the majority fall in the grey area in between, where an optimistic assessor would find merit, but a critical assessor would find fault."

In a 2012 article in Wired entitled "The Fraudulent Business of Earthquake and Eruption Prediction", Erik Klemetti, an assistant professor of Geosciences at Ohio's Denison University accused Corbyn of "cherry picking" and said people who claimed to be able to forecast earthquakes were "faith healers of the geologic community and should be seen as such."

Media coverage
Critics have pointed to inaccurate predictions, such as a white Easter in 1989, and "raging weather" in September 1997. WeatherAction predictions were contested by the Met Office in 2008.

While he was Mayor of London, Boris Johnson repeatedly suggested that Corbyn might be correct on anthropogenic climate change.

2021 Mayor of London campaign 
In January 2021, it was announced that Corbyn would stand for his own party, Let London Live, in the 2021 London mayoral election and 2021 London Assembly election. On 19 April, Corbyn told the BBC that if he were to be elected then he would "end lockdown on day one as mayor". He finished 11th with 20,604 votes in the mayoral election, while his party finished 12th on the London-wide list with 15,755 votes.

Promotion of conspiracy theories
In 2020, Corbyn was reported by Hope not Hate and the Community Security Trust to have attended a meeting organised by Keep Talking, a conspiracy theory discussion group based in the United Kingdom which invites guest speakers involved in Holocaust denial.

Climate change denial

Corbyn rejects the scientific consensus on climate change. He denies that humans play a role in climate change, and spreads false and discredited narratives about the issue. He has claimed that the media, Met Office and "corrupt scientists" are brainwashing the public as part of a Qatar-run conspiracy to keep oil prices high.

Corbyn criticised Margaret Thatcher's acceptance of the fact of anthropogenic global warming (also saying that she later recanted her position) around the time of the 1984–85 miners' strike, judging it a disingenuous attempt to justify shutting down coal mines.

Corbyn has stated his belief that the anthropogenic contribution to global warming is minimal, with any increase in temperature due to increased solar activity. In 2009 he attended the International Conference on Climate Change organised by the Heartland Institute.

Corbyn appears on talk shows to discuss what he considers to be weaknesses of the argument for anthropogenic global warming. He featured in a Channel 4 documentary The Great Global Warming Swindle in 2007; a scientifically reviewed complaint to Ofcom noted that he was introduced as 'Dr Piers Corbyn, Climate Forecaster' despite not having a doctorate nor any qualification specifically in climate science or environmental science.

In 2015, BBC Radio 4 apologised for an "unfortunate lapse" in a documentary presented by Daily Mail journalist Quentin Letts, which featured Corbyn in a critique of the Met Office's views on climate change while failing to mention the scientific consensus.

In 2016, Corbyn was allowed to participate in a BBC climate change debate which resulted in many people complaining to the BBC for giving him airtime.

He was interviewed by Dutch filmmaker Marijn Poels for his 2017 documentary feature film about climate, energy and agriculture, called The Uncertainty Has Settled.

In April 2019, Corbyn tweeted about the Swedish environmental activist Greta Thunberg with an image of her next to a Nazi swastika, describing her as an "ignorant, brainwashed child".

COVID-19 denial

Corbyn has asserted his false belief that COVID-19 and the associated ongoing pandemic is a "hoax". On Twitter on 16 March 2020, he tweeted from an account that was later suspended an unfounded conspiracy theory that Bill Gates, George Soros and others had created the pandemic, that this was to mass vaccinate the world's population, and that vaccines are dangerous. He called the pandemic a "psychological operation to close down the economy in the interests of mega-corporations" on Good Morning Britain; Dr. Hilary Jones described his views as spurious and "extremely dangerous" and hosts Piers Morgan and Susanna Reid challenged him during the programme.

2020
On 16 May 2020, Corbyn was one of 19 people arrested for refusing to leave and failing to provide details whilst protesting against the UK's COVID-19 lockdown in Hyde Park, London. On this occasion, he advocated coronavirus-related 5G conspiracy theories and anti-vaccination claims before being arrested.

On 30 May, Corbyn attended another protest at Hyde Park, and was again charged with, as described in The Independent, "contravening coronavirus rules".

On 29 August, Corbyn was arrested by the Metropolitan Police near Trafalgar Square and warned he would be issued with a fixed penalty notice (FPN) for £10,000, on suspicion of breaking new Health Protection Regulations (2020) for the offence of holding a gathering of more than 30 people in an outdoor place. He appeared alongside conspiracy theorist David Icke and singer Chico Slimani. Corbyn was fined £10,000 for organising an anti-lockdown rally in Trafalgar Square, London.

On 5 September, Corbyn attended and helped to organise an anti-lockdown rally organised by StandUpX Mission in Sheffield. During the rally he argued: that the lockdown was taking place so the British government can "end your rights and freedom, to control you"; that the shift to mass vaccination was dangerous; and that the British government have a hidden agenda. At the end of the rally, Corbyn was arrested and charged with three offences under the Health Protection (Coronavirus) Regulations 2020. The charges were later dropped.

On 6 September, Corbyn invited Sadiq Khan to permit a rally in Trafalgar Square London at noon on 26 September, and he invited MPs of any party to speak from the podium at the London rally. On 18 September, Corbyn spoke at a rally in Cornwall against the use of face masks to protect against COVID-19, and described all politicians as liars. On 24 September, Corbyn was one of the main speakers at an anti-mask rally in Norwich. On 26 September, Corbyn attended a rally in Leeds and repeated the claims he had made in Cornwall. By mid-September, Corbyn had been blamed for a split among conspiracy theorists promoting misinformation about COVID-19, with Kate Shemirani and  Mark Steele no longer sharing platforms with Corbyn and David Icke.

On 3 October, Corbyn attended and spoke at an anti-lockdown protest at Old Market Square in Nottingham. On 9 October, Corbyn attended an anti-lockdown event in Oxford. On 11 October, Corbyn attended an anti-lockdown protest outside the Welsh Parliament in Cardiff. He expressed his opposition to masks and told protesters to "free your face". On 14 October, Corbyn was the leader of an anti-lockdown protest in Sheffield. During his speech at the protest, he called for supporters to disobey public health restrictions. He described the British Parliament as a "brainwashing institution" that was full of "fake scientists" who are "paid liars".

On 14 October, Corbyn attended an anti-lockdown protest in Bristol which was organised by the conspiracy theory group Stand UpX. He was one of fourteen people who were arrested for breaching new laws on assembly during the pandemic.

On 16 October, Corbyn attended a demonstration in Soho, London, against the 10pm pub curfew. He said: "We're here to drink against the curfew. To oppose the lockdowns, to oppose job losses caused by lockdowns, to oppose all of it. The whole lot should be lifted now."

On 17 October, Corbyn attended an anti-lockdown protest through Hyde Park and Oxford Street in London. Corbyn said to the crowd "Bill Gates wants vaccinations to control you and to control women's fertility to reduce world population".

On 18 October, Corbyn attended an anti-lockdown protest in Clayton Square, Liverpool City Centre. In a speech to protesters, he denied the existence of COVID-19, also suggested it was a bioweapon, and said "it was used to unleash the most monstrous power-grab the world has ever seen".

On 24 October, Corbyn attended an anti-lockdown protest by Save Our Rights UK using the slogan "Stop The New Normal" in London. The police determined that the protesters were not adhering to the coronavirus rules and decided to break up the protest. At least 18 people were arrested during the protest.

Corbyn was due to appear at Westminster Magistrates' Court on 17 November 2020 for breaching coronavirus rules on 16 and 30 May 2020. He was due to stand trial on 23 October 2020, but late disclosure of police logbooks delayed the proceedings. Corbyn's barrister told the court that he was "specifically targeted" by the police. Corbyn spoke outside of the court before the hearing on 23 October 2020: "Whatever happens, if they impose a fine, I will not pay the fine. I'm not going to pay any fines for these anti-just, illegal laws".

Corbyn initiated and conceptualised an anti-vaccination leaflet which was distributed in Barnet and other areas of North London in December 2020 and Southwark in January 2021 comparing the Covid vaccine campaign to the Holocaust. The leaflet features a drawing of the entrance to the Auschwitz concentration camp in which the Nazis' slogan Arbeit macht frei ("Work sets you free") has been altered to read "Vaccines are safe path to freedom." The leaflet includes the false claim "some vaccines contain nanochips which can electronically track recipients." Corbyn confirmed to the London Evening Standard that he was part of the group responsible for the leaflet. 
Corbyn denied the accusation of antisemitism by saying, "I was married for 22 years to a Jewess and obviously her mother's forebears fled the Baltic states just before the war because of Hitler or the Nazis in general. I've worked with Jewish leading world scientists over the last 30 years. I've also employed Jewish people in my business Weather Action, one of whom was a superb worker".

2021
During a voluntary visit to a London police station, Corbyn was arrested on 3 February 2021 on suspicion of malicious communications and public nuisance in connection with the leaflet; he was released on bail until early March, along with a man aged 37. Corbyn was arrested again at a protest in Fulham, West London on 27 February. In the meantime, he claimed to Sky News via email that, while he accepted the existence of COVID-19, he spuriously compared it to flu, contradicting his leaflet's claim that COVID does not exist, as well as denying that there was a pandemic. On 1 March the Metropolitan Police reported that Corbyn had been charged along with Kate Shemirani for a series of breaches of the UK Coronavirus regulations.

In June, the police began investigating Corbyn after they became aware of a video that surfaced online of him removing public health signs informing people to maintain social distance and to wear a face mask on a London Underground train.

On 10 July, Corbyn and other anti-lockdown protesters staged a protest outside a vaccine centre bus in Brighton and Hove, which subsequently caused the NHS Brighton and Hove CCG to announce that they had to cancel some vaccine jabs because of "disruption during the anti-lockdown measures protest in the city". The protest was condemned by the Brighton and Hove council leader Phelim Mac Cafferty, who said, "It is incredibly disappointing to see the irresponsible actions of a few putting in danger the many", as well as by England fans who were attending the Euro 2020 cup final who drowned out the anti-lockdown protesters by loudly singing football chants.

On 20 July, Corbyn attended and spoke at a protest outside the Labour Party's headquarters opposing the expulsion of Labour Party members who had been accused of anti-semitism. He said that he was "100 per cent" behind "those being purged from the Labour Party". During his speech, Corbyn claimed that complying with the government's vaccine rollout was the same as the German people submitting to Nazi rule, he said, "You know what happened in Germany... they believed in Hitler. You know what happened, the rest is history". Corbyn's attendance at the protest was not welcomed by everyone present at the protest, and some of the protesters distanced themselves from him due to his COVID-19 denial.

In July, YouTube pranksters Josh Pieters and Archie Manners, posing as AstraZeneca investors, met Corbyn and offered him £10,000 under the condition that he would stop criticising the AstraZeneca vaccine. In reality, Corbyn received Monopoly board game money. The pranksters told LBC when asked whether they feel sorry for Corbyn that they feel more sorry for "those he's conning".

Corbyn was present at an anti-vaxxer demonstration on 9 August outside Television Centre, London (protesters falsely assumed it was still a major BBC facility) and outside the ITN building on Gray's Inn Road on 23 August 2021.

In September 2021, Corbyn staged a protest outside the Old Bailey in London, on the day former Metropolitan Police officer Wayne Couzens was being sentenced for the Murder of Sarah Everard. Corbyn claimed the fact that Couzens showed Everard his police warrant card and claimed to be arresting her for breaches of the UK's lockdown regulations in order to kidnap her was evidence that coronavirus laws were "not about controlling a virus" but instead "about controlling the public", but the protest was widely seen as inappropriate given the highly disturbing and emotive nature of the Everard murder, and a passerby approached Corbyn shouting "How dare you hijack Sarah’s death for your own cause?".

In November 2021, Corbyn featured in a low-budget music video on the London Underground, singing an anti-mask song with the lyrics, "Wearing a mask is like trying to keep a fart in your trousers".

Corbyn attended another large demonstration against the UK government's proposed COVID restrictions on 18 December 2021 in Parliament Square. There, he featured in another music video, this time alongside rapper Remeece, in which they walk through crowds of protestors whilst repeatedly calling for viewers to refuse to take the COVID-19 vaccine. In a later speech at the demonstration, Corbyn's comments on these proposals to enforce guidelines to combat the spread of the Omicron variant of the virus were met with widespread backlash. He had urged the crowd "to hammer to death those scum, those scum who have decided to go ahead with introducing new fascism", as well as suggesting that the offices of MPs who had voted for the restrictions should be burned down. Home Secretary Priti Patel responded to online footage of Corbyn's speech, describing it as "sickening" and called for the police to take action against him. On 19 December, Corbyn was arrested for his comments.

See also

Notes

References

1947 births
Living people
5G conspiracy theorists
Alumni of Imperial College London
Alumni of Queen Mary University of London
British anti-vaccination activists
Jeremy Corbyn
Councillors in the London Borough of Southwark
COVID-19 conspiracy theorists
English conspiracy theorists
English meteorologists
Housing rights activists
International Marxist Group members
Labour Party (UK) councillors
People educated at Castle House School
People from Chippenham
20th-century squatters